The Karafuto Fortress was the defensive unit formed by the Karafuto fortification installations, and the Karafuto detachment of Japanese forces, the
88th Division. The headquarters was in Toyohara, capital of the province, based on the Suzuya plain, in the Southern Karafuto area, not far from the ports of Otomari and Maoka.

Conformation of Fortified district in Karafuto Prefecture
One example of such defensive structure was in Japanese fortifications to the north of Koton (Naramitoshi) Fortress (now Pobedino) part of Shikuka Fortified District (FD). It extended twelve kilometers along the front and was thirty kilometers deep, between the cities of Hanno, Futaro,
Horomi, Miyuki and Horonai with central command in Koton. In this area, along the principal railroad that crossed the island from north to south, there were 17 permanent emplacements, 31 artillery and 108 machine gun bunkers, 28 artillery and 18 mortar positions and 150 shelters, these installations was constructed by Obishiro Nayaro in 1939 over ancient fortifications from the Russian-Japanese War period. The Karafuto Mixed Brigade protecting the fortified district was expanded 28 February to 88th Division. Together with support units it numbered up to 20,000 officers and men. The Japanese had 10,000 Military veterans serving as reservists and civil volunteer defenders.
This structure was very similar in the following areas:
Toyohara Fortified District
Toyo-Sakae Fortified District
Otomari Fortified District
Rutaka Fortified District
Honto Fortified District
Maoka Fortified District
Tomarioru Fortified District
Motodomari Fortified District
Shikuka Fortified District
Esutoru Fortified District
Kita Nayoshi Fortified District

additionally including airbases, Naval bases, some Army or Navy detachments and others, along with civil defence units inland.

Karafuto Fortification system
Special frontier unit with HQ in Toyohara and detachments and
fortified installations in:

Southern Karafuto Fortress area

Toyohara Sub-Prefecture
Toyohara Fortified District
3 detachments
3 fortifications
1 airfield

Otomari Sub-Prefecture
Toyo-Sakae Fortified District
1 detachment
4 fortifications
1 airfield
Otomari Fortified District
2 detachments
5 fortifications
1 airfield
1 naval base
Rutaka Fortified District
2 fortifications
1 airfield

Maoka Sub-Prefecture
Honto Fortified District
2 fortifications
1 airfield
Maoka Fortified District
2 fortifications
1 airfield
1 Naval Base
Tomarioru Fortified District
1 detachment

Northern Karafuto Fortress Area

Shikuka Sub-Prefecture
Mototomari Fortified District
5 fortifications
Shikuka Fortified District
3 airfields
7 fortifications
2 detachments
3 frontier posts

Esutoru Sub-Prefecture
Esutoru Fortified District
7 fortifications
1 detachment
1 airfield
Kita Nayoshi Fortified District
3 fortifications
1 frontier post

Karafuto Detachment
88th Division HQ. (Toyohara) (Lt. Gen. Junichiro Mineki)
25th Infantry Regiment
125th Infantry Regiment
306th Infantry Regiment
88th Mountain Gun Regiment
88th Signals company
88th Transport Regiment
88th Railway Guards Unit
351st Special Guards Battalion
352nd Special Guards Battalion
353rd Special Guards Battalion
301st Special Guards Company
303rd Special Guards Engineer Unit
50th Infantry Battalion (served as Koton Fortress detachment)

Japanese Navy detachments in Karafuto
Japanese naval forces, had some bases and infantry naval detachments in Maoka (front at the Strait of Tartary) and Otomari (in Aniwa Gulf) ports, the principal ports in Karafuto. Probably there were some units in ports in coasts of Taraika Bay, and city of Esutoru at north of province.

References

Karafuto
History of Sakhalin
Military history of Japan during World War II